Raymond Walburn (September 9, 1887 – July 26, 1969) was an American character actor of stage and screen who appeared in dozens of Hollywood movie comedies and an occasional dramatic role during the 1930s and 1940s.

Life and career
Born in Plymouth, Indiana, Walburn in the early 1900s moved to Oakland, California, and began acting on stage, which was also his mother's profession. He performed in stock theater for only four years before being cast on Broadway, where he made his debut in Cordelia Blossom in 1914. Over a half century later, in 1965, Walburn acted in his final Broadway production,  A Very Rich Woman. During his long career, he also toured extensively, performing on stages throughout the United States and in other countries.

Walburn did not make an impact in films until 1934 with the release of The Count of Monte Cristo starring Robert Donat. His filmography includes nearly 100 films, with his best known roles as a stereotypical bumbler and as a pompous snob. He could also be villainous, as he was when he played Baron Danglars in the 1934 film version of The Count of Monte Cristo, and was a favorite of such celebrated comedy directors as Preston Sturges and Frank Capra, with whom he made several appearances.

Complete filmography

The Man Hunt (1916 short) as Captain Steadwell
The Tarantula (1916) as Saunders
The Scarlet Runner (1916 serial) as John Brown
Our Other Lives (1916 short)
The Laughing Lady (1929) as Hector Lee
The Great Flirtation (1934) as Henry Morgan
The Defense Rests (1934) as Austin
The Count of Monte Cristo (1934) as Danglars
Lady by Choice (1934) as Front O'Malley
Jealousy (1934) as Phil
Broadway Bill (1934) as Col. Pettigrew
Mills of the Gods (1934) as Willard Hastings
Society Doctor (1935) as Dr. Waverly
Death Flies East (1935) as Evans
I'll Love You Always (1935) as Charlie
It's a Small World (1935) as Julius Clummerhorn
Welcome Home (1935) as Giltedge
Redheads on Parade (1935) as Augustus Twill
She Married Her Boss (1935) as Franklin
She Couldn't Take It (1935) as Party Guest (uncredited)
Thanks a Million (1935) as Judge Culliman
The Lone Wolf Returns (1935) as Jenkins
The Great Ziegfeld (1936) as Sage
Mr. Deeds Goes to Town (1936) as Walter, the butler
Absolute Quiet (1936) as Governor Pruden
The King Steps Out (1936) as Col. Von Kempen
The Three Wise Guys (1936) as Doc Brown
They Met in a Taxi (1936) as Mr. Roger Clifton
Craig's Wife (1936) as Billy Birkmire
Mr. Cinderella (1936) as Peter Randolph
Born to Dance (1936) as Captain Dingby
Breezing Home (1937) as Clint Evans
Let's Get Married (1937) as B.B. Harrington
Thin Ice (1937) as Uncle Dornik
It Can't Last Forever (1937) as Dr. Fothergill
High, Wide, and Handsome (1937) as Doc Watterson
Broadway Melody of 1938 (1937) as Herman Whipple
Murder in Greenwich Village (1937) as The Senator
Start Cheering (1938) as Dean Worthington
Battle of Broadway (1938) as Homer C. Bundy
Professor Beware (1938) as Judge James G. Parkhouse Marshall
Gateway (1938) as Mr. Benjamin McNutt
Sweethearts (1938) as Orlando
Let Freedom Ring (1939) as Underwood
It Could Happen to You (1939) as J. Hadden Quigley
The Under-Pup (1939) as Mr. Layton
Eternally Yours (1939) as Mr. Harley Bingham
Heaven with a Barbed Wire Fence (1939) as Professor B. Townsend Thayer
Dark Command (1940) as Judge Buckner
Millionaires in Prison (1940) as Bruce Vander
Flowing Gold (1940) as Ellery Q. 'Wildcat' Chalmers
Third Finger, Left Hand (1940) as Mr. Sherwood
Christmas in July (1940) as Dr. Maxford
The San Francisco Docks (1940) as Adm. Andy Tracy
Bachelor Daddy (1941) as George Smith
Puddin' Head (1941) as Harold Montgomery Sr.
Kiss the Boys Goodbye (1941) as Top Rumson
Confirm or Deny (1941) as H. Cyrus Stuyvesant
Rise and Shine (1941) as Colonel Bacon
Louisiana Purchase (1941) as Col. Davis Sr. aka Polar Bear
The Man in the Trunk (1942) as Jim Cheevers
Lady Bodyguard (1943) as Avery Jamieson
Dixie Dugan (1943) as J.J. Lawson
The Desperadoes (1943) as Judge Cameron
Dixie (1943) as Mr. Cook
Let's Face It (1943) as Julian Watson
And the Angels Sing (1944) as Pop Angel
Hail the Conquering Hero (1944) as Mayor Everett J. Noble
Arsenic and Old Lace (1944) as Drummer at baseball game (uncredited)
Music in Manhattan (1944) as Professor Carl Roberti
Heavenly Days (1944) as Mr. Popham
Honeymoon Abroad (1945) as Rollie Mack
I'll Tell the World (1945) as H.I. Bailey
The Cheaters (1945) as Willie Crawford
Breakfast in Hollywood (1946) as Richard Cartwright
Lover Come Back (1946) as J.P. 'Joe' Winthrop
Rendezvous with Annie (1946) as Everett Thorndyke
Plainsman and the Lady (1946) as Judge Winters
Affairs of Geraldine (1946) as Amos Hartwell
The Sin of Harold Diddlebock (1947) as E.J. Waggleberry
State of the Union (1948) as Judge Alexander
Henry, the Rainmaker (1949) as Henry Latham
Leave It to Henry (1949) as Henry Latham
Red, Hot and Blue (1949) as Alex Ryan Creek
Key to the City (1950) as Mayor Billy Butler
Riding High (1950) as Prof. Pettigrew
Father Makes Good (1950) as Henry Latham
Father's Wild Game (1950) as Henry Latham
Short Grass (1950) as Doctor McKenna
Father Takes the Air (1951) as Henry Latham
Excuse My Dust (1951) as Mayor Fred Haskell
Golden Girl (1951) as Cornelius
She Couldn't Say No (1952) as Judge Hobart
The Spoilers (1955) as Mr. Skinner

References

External links

1887 births
1969 deaths
20th-century American male actors
American male film actors
American male stage actors
American male television actors
Male actors from Indiana
Burials at Ferncliff Cemetery
Male actors from New York City
People from Plymouth, Indiana